Kagiso (David) Tsebe (born 9 November 1966) is a retired marathon runner from South Africa. He won the 1992 edition of the Berlin Marathon on 27 September 1992, clocking 2:08:07. With that time Tsebe ended up in first place in the year rankings.

Achievements
All results regarding marathon, unless stated otherwise

Source:Association of Road Racing Statisticians (ARRS)-Runner:David Tsebe

References

South African male long-distance runners
1966 births
Living people
Place of birth missing (living people)
South African male marathon runners
Berlin Marathon male winners